Shiki, or Gubi, is one of the Bantu languages of Nigeria, spoken in Bauchi State.

References

Jarawan languages
Languages of Nigeria